The Fundamental Agreement of the New Haven Colony was signed on June 4, 1639.  The free planters (founders of the New Haven Colony) who assented to the agreement are listed below:

William Andrews
Richard Beach 
Richard Beckley 
John Benham 
Jarvis Boykin 
John Brockett
William Browning 
John Budd 
John Chapmen 
John Charles
Ezekiel Cheever 
James Clark
John Clarke 
John Cogswell 
John Cooper 
Jasper Crane 
John Davenport
Jeremiah Dixion
Samuel Eaton
Theophilus Eaton
Nicholas Elsey
Timothy Ford
Thomas Fugill 
Matthew Gilbert
Francis Hall
Matthias Hitchcock 
Andrew Hull 
Thomas Jeffries
William Ives 
Thomas Kimberley
Benjamin Ling 
Richard Malbon 
Nathaniel Merriman
Andrew Messenger
John Moss (Morse)
Matthew Moulthrop
Francis Newman
Robert Newman 
Richard Osborne 
Edward Patteson
John Peacock 
William Peck
Richard Perry
John Ponderson
William Potter 
William Preston
John Reader (Reeder)
Robert Seeley
George Smith 
William Thorpe 
Nathaniel Turner 
William Tuttle 
George Ward 
Lawrence Ward 
Samuel Whitehead 
Edward Wigglesworth 
Mr. Wilkes 
Benjamin Wilmot
Thomas Yale
 Thomas Munson

References

See also
Thirteen Colonies
Fundamental Orders of Connecticut

English colonization of the Americas
Connecticut Colony
History of the Thirteen Colonies
1639 in law